USS Santa Barbara was the name of two ships in the United States Navy. These ships were named for the city of Santa Barbara, California.

  a steel freighter, built during 1916, which served from 1918 until 1919.
 , a Kilauea-class ammunition ship that served from 1970 until 1998.

United States Navy ship names